Lin Yu-chun; born 9 March 1986 in Taipei) is a Taiwanese singer, who gained fame by appearing on a Taiwanese talent show, One Million Star (超級星光大道), singing "I Will Always Love You" (written and originally sung by Dolly Parton) in the style of Whitney Houston's cover version. Lin is well known for his mezzo-soprano-like, and sometimes, contralto-like countertenor singing voice, although he has an adult speaking voice.  According to many sources, Lin's voice is usually described as a mixture of Whitney Houston and Susan Boyle, with a dash of Cher.   When Lin sings in his normal masculine voice rather than in a falsetto range, his voice actually somewhat sounds like Jamie Walters, or even possibly like Jackson Browne, and to a lesser extent, George Harrison.  .  In 2013, he competed in the second season of The Voice of China.

Biography
Lin was voted off the show, but after a video of Lin singing the song made it onto YouTube, Lin became an internet celebrity, receiving more than 10,000,000 views of his performance. Many news sources dubbed Lin "Taiwan's Susan Boyle". In an interview, Lin Yu Chun explained that he selected 
"I Will Always Love You" to show his gratitude to his grandmother for taking care of Lin over the years.

In April 2010, he visited the United States and performed "I Will Always Love You" and Amazing Grace on The Ellen DeGeneres Show. On the same trip, he attended Lopez Tonight and performed "Saving All My Love for You" (also a Whitney Houston cover) and Total Eclipse of the Heart (originally by Bonnie Tyler) as a duet with William Shatner.

Sony Music Taiwan announced they had signed Lin Yu Chun to a record deal. Lin Yu-chun's signing press conference occurred on 13 May 2010, and was held in Shanghai San Want Hotel.

On 22 May 2010, at Dodgers Stadium during a Los Angeles Dodgers game, he sang "The Star-Spangled Banner", "God Bless America" and "Taiwan, Touch Your Heart". On 11 August 2010 Lin sang Whitney Houston's "I Will Always Love You" on America's Got Talent season 5 on the YouTube selection episode, receiving a standing ovation from the crowd. Lin has been slated to play the role of Liu Lucy for the HBO Asia produced miniseries Untold Stories of 1949.  In 2013, he competed in the second season of The Voice of China.

One Million Star
On 26 March 2010, Lin sang John Newton's "Amazing Grace", earning Lin 24 points (his opponent, Zhang Shi-Tang, got 19 points).
On 2 April 2010, Lin sang Whitney Houston's "I Will Always Love You", earning Lin 25 points (his opponent, Su Zhi-Yu, got 22 points).
On 9 April 2010, Lin sang Shunza's "Coming Home" – 17 points (his opponent, Zhang Shi-Tang, got 20 points)
On 30 April 2010,Lin sang Celine Dion's "My Heart Will Go On" as a guest performer. 
On 14 May 2010, Lin sang "I Dreamed a Dream" from Les Misérables as a guest performer.
Lin also sang a duet with Kenny G., performing Whitney Houston's "Saving All My Love For You".

Discography

I Will Always Love You (2010)  SICP-2778 
Lin Yu Chun's debut is a mini-album, I Will Always Love You, released in Japanese on 8 September 2010 specially for the Japanese market.  It contains four songs from Lin's upcoming international debut, It's My Time, and a Japanese-only bonus track, "Hello," a Japanese cover of Lionel Richie's hit from 1984.

Track listing

It's My Time (2010)
Lin's full-length international debut album, It's My Time, was released on 17 September 2010, as a compilation of English-language pop songs previously recorded by major artists such as Mariah Carey, Kelly Clarkson, etc. The song "Under Your Wings" was written new for this album by Grammy-winning musician Walter Afanasieff.

Track listing

未來的第一站 (2010)

Track listing

Endlessly (2011)

Track listing

MV Performance

Guest Performance 

 2009 - "H2H" by Cyndi Wang
 2021 - "Ain't Gonna Wait" by Rose Liu (Liu Mingxiang 刘明湘)

Promo Videos 

 May 2010 - Haagon Dazs advertisement
 October 2010 - VL Sports (緯來體育台) advertisement
 January 2011 - The Body Shop advertisement
 January 2014 - "Carchs" advertisement
 June 2015 - Yanjing Beer advertisement

References

External links 

Lin Yu Chun's Official Website 
Lin Yu Chun【I will Always Love You】 Music Video (HD).
Ellen Show Lin (Jimmy) Yu Chun sings I Will Always Love You.
Lin Yu Chun "Under Your Wings" Official MV
Dolly Parton watches Lin Yu Chun sings I Will Always Love You.
Lin Yu Chun's personal album

1986 births
Countertenors
Living people
Musicians from Taipei
One Million Star contestants
The Voice of China contestants
21st-century Taiwanese male singers